Beverley Ann Schäfer is a South African politician serving as the Deputy Speaker of the Western Cape Provincial Parliament since May 2019. She served as the Western Cape Provincial Minister of Economic Opportunities from November 2018 to May 2019. Between June 2014 and October 2018, she served as the Chairperson of the Portfolio Committee on Economic Opportunities, Tourism and Agriculture in the provincial parliament. She was the Cape Town City Councillor for Ward 54 from 2011 to 2014. She is a member of the Democratic Alliance (DA).

Political career
Schäfer served as Head of the Democratic Alliance's Online Marketing and Social Media Department from 2009 until 2011. In May 2011, she was elected as the Cape Town City Councillor for Ward 54. The ward included areas such as Green Point, Mouille Point, Robben Island, Sea Point, Fresnaye, Bantry Bay, Clifton and northern parts of Camps Bay.

She served as a councillor until she was elected to Western Cape Provincial Parliament in May 2014. She took office as a Member on 21 May 2014. Schäfer was subsequently appointed Chairperson of the Portfolio Committee on Economic Opportunities and a whip for the Democratic Alliance in the legislature.

On 19 October 2018, Premier Helen Zille announced that Schäfer would succeed Alan Winde as Provincial Minister of Economic Opportunities. She was sworn in on 1 November 2018 by Western Cape Judge President John Hlophe.

Schäfer was elected Deputy Speaker of the Western Cape Provincial Parliament on 22 May 2019, succeeding Piet Pretorius.

In March 2023, Schäfer was criticised for organising an event at the Provincial Parliament for British cardiologist and COVID-19 vaccine critic Aseem Malhotra to talk about "unsafe and ineffective" vaccines. Speaker Daylin Mitchell and premier Alan Winde both condemned the event.

References

Living people
Democratic Alliance (South Africa) politicians
Members of the Western Cape Provincial Parliament
White South African people
Women members of provincial legislatures of South Africa
21st-century South African women politicians
21st-century South African politicians
Year of birth missing (living people)
Women legislative speakers